O Jardineiro Espanhol is a 1967 Brazilian telenovela that is based on A. J. Cronin's  1950 novel The Spanish Gardener. The series was written by Tatiana Belinky and directed by Fabio Sabag. It starred Ednei Giovenazzi as Nicholas, and Osmano Cardoso as the gardener. Other actors included Ana Rosa, João José Pompeo, Marcus Toledo, and Paulo Villaça. The British film adaptation was released in 1956, and TV Tupi originally broadcast another Brazilian adaptation of Cronin's novel in 1958.

External links 
Webpage about O Jardineiro Espanhol (in Portuguese)
 
 (1958 Brazilian telenovela)

1967 telenovelas
Brazilian telenovelas
1967 Brazilian television series debuts
1967 Brazilian television series endings
Television shows based on British novels
Television shows based on works by A. J. Cronin